James Jennings Gaudet (born June 3, 1955 in New Orleans, Louisiana) is a former Major League Baseball catcher who played for two seasons. He played for the Kansas City Royals in three games during the 1978 Kansas City Royals season and 1979 Kansas City Royals seasons.

External links

1955 births
Living people
Kansas City Royals players
Syracuse Chiefs players
Major League Baseball catchers
Baseball players from New Orleans
Evansville Triplets players
Gulf Coast Royals players
Jacksonville Suns players
Omaha Royals players
Tulane Green Wave baseball players
Jesuit High School (New Orleans) alumni